Marleyella maldivensis is a flatfish of the family Pleuronectidae.

References

Pleuronectidae
Fish of the Indian Ocean
Fish described in 1939
Endemic fauna of the Maldives